Dermatopsoides is a genus of viviparous brotulas.

Species
There are currently four recognized species in this genus:
 Dermatopsoides andersoni Møller & Schwarzhans, 2006 (Anderson's mudbrotula)
 Dermatopsoides kasougae (J. L. B. Smith, 1943) (Orange brotula)
 Dermatopsoides morrisonae Møller & Schwarzhans, 2006 (Morrison's mudbrotula)
 Dermatopsoides talboti Cohen, 1966 (Lesser orange brotula)

References

Bythitidae